The World Cyber Games (WCG) is an international esports competition with multi-game titles in which hundreds of esports athletes from around the world participate in a variety of competitions also known as Esports Olympics. WCG events attempt to emulate a traditional sporting tournament, such as the Olympic Games; events included an official opening ceremony, and players from various countries competing for gold, silver, and bronze medals. WCG are held every year in other cities around the world. The WCG 2020 competition received nearly  views worldwide.

General
World Cyber Games is one of the largest global esports tournament, with divisions in various countries. The World Cyber Games, created by International Cyber Marketing CEO Yooseop Oh and backed financially by Samsung, was considered the e-sports Olympics; events included an official opening ceremony, and players from various countries competing for gold, silver and bronze medals.  The organization itself had an official mascot, and used an Olympic Games inspired logo.  Organizations from each participating country conducted preliminary events at a regional level, before conducting national finals to determine the players best suited to represent them in the main World Cyber Games tournament event.  All events had areas for spectators, but the tournament could also be viewed over internet video streams.

Besides providing a platform for tournament gaming, the World Cyber Games was used as a marketing tool; sponsors, such as Samsung, using the space around the venue to set up product demonstrations and stalls.  In addition, advertisers saw the event as a good means to reach young male audiences, who may not be exposed to traditional advertising streams via television.

History

In 2000, the World Cyber Games was formed, and an event was held titled "The World Cyber Game Challenge", which began with an opening ceremony on 7 October.  The event was sponsored by the Republic of Korea's Ministry of Culture and Tourism, Ministry of Information and Communications, and Samsung.  It brought together teams from 17 countries to compete against each other in PC games including Quake III Arena, FIFA 2000, Age of Empires II, and StarCraft: Brood War.  The tournament ended on 15 October 2000. The competition initially had 174 competitors from 17 different countries with a total prize purse of $20,000.

In 2001, the World Cyber Games held their first main event, hosted in Seoul, Korea, with a prize pool of $300,000 USD.  National preliminaries were held between March and September, with the main tournament running between 5 December to 9 December.  The World Cyber Games quoted an attendance of 389,000 competitors in the preliminaries, with 430 players advancing to the final tournament; teams from 24 countries in total were involved in the tournament.

In 2002, the World Cyber Games held a larger event in Daejeon, Korea with a prize pool of US$1,300,000; 450,000 competitors took part in the preliminary events, with 450 ultimately making it through to the final tournament.  The 2003 tournament, which took place in Seoul again, saw an even bigger prize pool of US$2,000,000, and was the first World Cyber Games tournament to feature a console based competition, with the game Halo: Combat Evolved on the Xbox.

In 2004, the World Cyber Games held a tournament in San Francisco, California, United States, the first tournament outside of its home country.  At this stage, the prize pool was at US$2,500,000; with 642 players competing in the grand final.  The tournament has since been hosted in various countries around the world; including Singapore in 2005 and Monza, Italy in 2006 - at this time Microsoft became a major sponsor to the event, who would provide software and hardware for all the events through to 2008.  In addition, all games played at the tournament would be based exclusively on Windows PC's or the Xbox console.

In 2006, the prize purse had risen to $462,000, and the event had grown to 9 different competitions and 700 qualified participants from 70 different countries.

In 2007, the event was hosted in Seattle, Washington, United States, with a total prize pool of US$4,000,000. In 2008, the tournament was hosted in Cologne, Germany; it was the first World Cyber Games tournament to incorporate a mobile-game based tournament, with Asphalt 4: Elite Racing,  In 2009, the tournament was held in Chengdu, China, and featured a special promotion of the game Dungeon & Fighter.  The tournament was also coincided to run alongside the World Cyber Games debut reality television show, WCG Ultimate Gamer.  Season 2 of WCG Ultimate Gamer was aired between August and October 2010.

In 2014 February, the CEO Brad Lee announced the closing of WCG. Several partners described difficulty working with the CEO and the organization.

In March 2017, the former Samsung owned WCG Trademark was transferred to Korean Publisher Smilegate. Plans to develop the WCG "into the world's top digital entertainment festival in the future". World Cyber Games 2018 should have been hosted in Bangkok on April 26–29, 2018, but was cancelled subsequently. World Cyber Games 2019 was hosted in Xi'an, China on July 18–21, 2019. The WCG 2020 competition received nearly  views worldwide.

World Cyber Game tournaments

References

 
Video game organizations
StarCraft competitions
Recurring sporting events established in 2000
Annual sporting events